Mandaean cosmology is the Gnostic conception of the universe in the religion of Mandaeism.

Mandaean cosmology is strongly influenced by Jewish, Babylonian, Persian, Egyptian, Greek, Manichaean and other Near Eastern religions and philosophies.

Emanations
The three major Emanations or "Lives" (Hayyi) in Mandaeism are:
The Second Life: Yushamin, the primal uthra
The Third Life: Abatur, the weigher of souls, and also the father of the uthri (plural of uthra)
The Fourth Life: Ptahil, the creator of the material world

The Second Life, Third Life, and Fourth Life are emanations of the First Life, Hayyi Rabbi (the Supreme God).

Realms
Mandaean cosmology divides the universe into three realms:

World of Light or Lightworld (alma ḏ-nhūra)
Tibil, or Earth
World of Darkness or underworld (alma ḏ-hšuka)

According to Book 3 of the Right Ginza, a "fruit (pira) within the fruit" and "ether (ayar) within the ether" had existed before the World of Light came into being. In a sort of "Big Bang," the World of Light comes into being along with the Great Jordan and uthras. Tibil and the World of Darkness are then formed by Ptahil and others after the World of Light came into existence.

World of Light

The World of Light is the primeval, transcendent world from which Tibil and the World of Darkness emerged. The Great Life (Hayyi Rabbi or Supreme God/Monad) and his uthras dwell in the World of Light. The World of Light is also the source of Piriawis, the Great Yardena (or (Jordan River)) of Life.

In Mandaean cosmology, ether (Mandaic: aiar or ayar) permeates outer space and the World of Light. Uthras travel by moving through ether. The Father is also sometimes mentioned as Ayar Rba ('Great Ether') or Ayar Ziwa ('Radiant Ether'). In Mandaeism, the "outer ether" (aiar baraia), mentioned in texts such as The Thousand and Twelve Questions, refers to the ether that permeates the cosmos, while the "inner ether" (aiar gawaia) refers to the "breath or pure air of Life within the soul".

The Mshunia Kushta is a section of the World of Light where spiritual counterparts or images called dmuta are found.

When a Mandaean person dies, priests perform elaborate death rituals or death masses called masiqta in order to help guide the soul (nišimta) towards the World of Light. In order to pass from Tibil (Earth) to the World of Light, the soul must go through multiple maṭarta (watch-stations, toll-stations, or purgatories; see also Arcs of Descent and Ascent and araf (Islam)) before finally being reunited with the dmuta, the soul's heavenly counterpart.

The Diwan Abatur mentions a heavenly tree called Shatrin (Šatrin) where the souls of unbaptized Mandaean children are temporarily nourished for 30 days. On the 30th day, Hibil Ziwa baptizes the souls of the children, who then continue on to the World of Light. The tree has a length of 360,000 parasangs according to the Diwan Abatur.

The idea has some parallels with the Gnostic concept of pleroma.

Tibil

Tibil, or Earth, is the middle, earthly realm in Mandaean cosmology. It is separated form the World of Light above and the World of Darkness below by ayar (aether). Rituals mediated by priests allow for a laufa (or laupa, meaning 'connection' or 'union') to be made from Tibil to the World of Light.

World of Darkness

The World of Darkness is ruled by its king Ur (Leviathan) and its queen Ruha, mother of the seven planets and twelve constellations. The great dark Ocean of Sup lies in the World of Darkness. The great dividing river of Hiṭfon, analogous to the river Styx in Greek mythology, separates the World of Darkness from the World of Light.

Directions
Mandaeism considers North, and hence also the North Pole and Polaris, to be auspicious and associated with the World of Light. Mandaeans face north when praying, and temples are also oriented towards the north. On the contrary, South is associated with the World of Darkness.

Planets

However, individually, some of the planets can be associated with positive qualities. The names of the seven planets in Mandaic are borrowed from Akkadian. Some of the names are ultimately derived from Sumerian, since Akkadian had borrowed many deity names from Sumerian.

The planets are listed according to the traditional Mandaean order of the planets as mentioned in Masco (2012).

Each planet is said to be carried in a ship. Drawings of these ships are found in various Mandaean scrolls, such as the Scroll of Abatur.

Calendar and zodiac

Dual counterparts

In Mandaeism, people, spirits, and places are often considered to have both earthly and heavenly counterparts (dmuta), which dwell in the Mshunia Kushta ("Realm of Truth").

See also
Ancient Mesopotamian religion
Babylonian astrology
Babylonian astronomy
Biblical cosmology
Emanationism
Gnosticism
Jewish mythology
Merkabah mysticism
Seder hishtalshelus (emanations) in Jewish mysticism
Sefirot (divine attributes) in Jewish mysticism
Religion and mythology
Religious cosmology
Zoroastrian cosmology

References